Malea Rose is an American actress, writer, and producer. Her career began with roles in American television and film including Lake Dead, Entourage, and New Girl. Rose also had a role in the 2017 drama Kidnap, where she played Claire.

Early life
Malea was born and raised on the North Shore of Kauai, Hawaii. Rose began performing at the age of 5, starting with the Kauai Community Theater Group. Rose did musical theater and entered singing competitions throughout her childhood. Rose performed at clown camp started by Wavy Gravy and members of The Grateful Dead called Camp Winnarainbow.

Rose was a competitive surfer at age 11. She won multiple surf contests, including The Roxy Pro, and was sponsored by Hurley.

At age 14, Rose started to host her own radio show on KKCR.

Rose graduated as valedictorian from Kula High School at the age of 16 before moving to California to attend Chapman University to get a BFA in Theater.

Personal life
Her Mother is Jewish, but Malea was raised with a little bit of everything, including Buddhism. Malea has eight ethnicities including Cherokee Indian, Pacific Islander, and Eastern European.

In 2012 for reasons unknown, Malea changed her surname from Richardson to Rose.

Rose is a member of the Upright Citizens Brigade and prides herself on being an advocate for women's rights and equality. She continues to work with many charities, particularly animal charities, and is currently in the process of developing her own projects as a writer/producer.

In 2020 Rose founded and serves as CEO to an ultra-clean, luxury skincare company called Vie En Rose.[2] She recently was featured in Patricia Bragg of Braggs Organic foods new book called Revolutionary Beauty, which will be released in February 2022.

Filmography
In 2017 Malea starred opposite Halle Berry in the action/thriller Kidnap.

In 2018 Rose partnered up with 2 time oscar winner Paul Haggis for a mini series, in development, based on a true crime story about Thalia Massie and famed attorney Clarence Darrow last case, The Massie Trial set on Oahu. Rose is writing, producing, and starring in the project, based on a book called Honor Killing by David E. Stannard. She recently partnered up with Scooter Braun production company SB Projects

In April 2021, Rose was the Executive Producer and Creative Director for one of the top 10 largest boxing PPV events in history, reinventing the world of boxing, called Triller Fight Club. YouTuber Jake Paul vs. Ben Askren were the main title cards and musical guests including Snoop Dogg and his new band Mount Westmore, Justin Bieber, The Black Keys, Doja Cat, Saweetie, Ice Cube, Too Short, E-40, Diplo, and Major Lazer performed. The event took place at the Mercedes Benz Stadium in Atlanta, Georgia. [3] [4] 

In 2021 Rose Executive Produced Jake Paul documentary called PRBLM Child, Jake's nickname, for FITE TV

Film

Television

References

External links

1986 births
Living people
21st-century American actresses
Actresses from Hawaii
American child actresses
American feminists
American film actresses
American television actresses
American voice actresses
Feminist artists
Chapman University alumni
People from Kauai